William Nelson (July 1, 1839October 26, 1913) was a Scottish American immigrant, newspaper publisher, and Republican politician.  He was a member of the Wisconsin State Senate, representing Vernon and Monroe counties in the 1872 and 1873 sessions, and was later editor of The Salt Lake Tribune, in Salt Lake City, Utah.

Biography

Born in Rutherglen, Scotland, he emigrated to the United States in 1842 with his father and settled in Jamestown, Wisconsin Territory, in 1843. Nelson was an editor and publisher, and started working for the Monroe Sentinel in 1852.

At the outbreak of the American Civil War, he volunteered for service in the Union Army and was enrolled as a private in Company I of the 10th Wisconsin Infantry Regiment.  He was promoted to sergeant during the organization of that regiment and was later promoted to first sergeant.  He was a member of the regiment through its entire service in the war, which saw several battles in the Kentucky and Tennessee theater.  He was captured along with many others of his regiment during the Battle of Chickamauga, and spent seventeen months as a prisoner of war.  He was subsequently given an honorary brevet to the rank of captain.

By the time he was released from captivity, his regiment had already been disbanded.  He returned to Wisconsin and moved to the village of Viroqua, in Vernon County, where he married Mary Elizabeth Fretwell (1840–1919) in 1866. In 1871, Nelson served as president of the Village of Viroqua. Then, in 1872 and 1873, Nelson served in the Wisconsin State Senate as a Republican. Nelson moved to Utah in 1876. There he first served as a United States marshal, and then joined the staff of The Salt Lake Tribune in 1881. Nelson died of a stroke while serving as editor of The Salt Lake Tribune.

Electoral history

Wisconsin Senate (1871)

| colspan="6" style="text-align:center;background-color: #e9e9e9;"| General Election, November 7, 1871

References

External links

1839 births
1913 deaths
People from Rutherglen
People from Jamestown, Wisconsin
People from Viroqua, Wisconsin
Scottish emigrants to the United States
People of Wisconsin in the American Civil War
Editors of Wisconsin newspapers
Editors of Utah newspapers
Mayors of places in Wisconsin
Republican Party Wisconsin state senators
The Salt Lake Tribune people